Trio is a popular South Indian soft drink, especially popular in Tamil Nadu.

It is manufactured and marketed by Kali Mark (Kalis Sparkling Water P Ltd.) It is a lesser known Kali Mark soda due to the focus on Bovonto.

It is marketed as a citric, juicy, orange drink that combines fresh orange with ice. The soda appears as bright orange.

The soda is one of the few indigenous sodas that survived the take-over by Coca-Cola and Pepsi during the mid 1990s. It is sold alongside other sodas such as Bovonto, Solo, and Vibro.

History 
Trio came into existence in 1968. Trio was used alongside Bovonto to compete with Coca-Cola and Pepsi.

References 

Indian brands
Indian drink brands
Indian drinks
Soft drinks